Alileh Sar (also Romanized as Alīleh Sar and ‘Alīlahsar) is a village in Ani Rural District, in the Central District of Germi County, Ardabil Province, Iran. At the 2006 census, its population was 169, in 32 families.

References 

Towns and villages in Germi County